This is an incomplete list of by-elections for the Victorian Legislative Assembly. A by-election may be held when a member's seat becomes vacant through resignation, death or some other reason.


{| class="wikitable"
|-
|colspan=9 |

60th Legislative Assembly (2022–2026) 
|-
!By-election !! Incumbent !! colspan=2|Party !! Reason !! Date !! Winner !! colspan=2|Party
|-
||Narracan
|Gary Blackwood
|| 
|Liberal
| VEC declared the election as failed due to the sudden death of Nationals candidate Shaun Gilchrist before the 2022 Victorian State Election.
|28 January 2023
|Wayne Farnham
|| 
|Liberal
|-
|colspan=9 |

59th Legislative Assembly (2018–2022) 
|-
|colspan=9|No by-elections held
|-
|colspan=9|

58th Legislative Assembly (2014–2018) 
|-
!By-election !! Incumbent !! colspan=2|Party !! Reason !! Date !! Winner !! colspan=2|Party
|- bgcolor="#C2F0C2"
||Northcote
|Fiona Richardson
|| 
|Labor
|Died
|18 November 2017
|Lidia Thorpe
|| 
|Greens
|-
||South-West Coast
|Denis Napthine
|| 
|Liberal
|Resigned
|31 October 2015
|Roma Britnell
|| 
|Liberal
|-
||Polwarth
|Terry Mulder
|| 
|Liberal
|Resigned
|31 October 2015
|Richard Riordan
|| 
|Liberal
|-
||Gippsland South
|Peter Ryan
|| 
|National
|Resigned
|14 March 2015
|Danny O'Brien
|| 
|National
|-
|colspan=9 |

57th Legislative Assembly (2010–2014) 
|-
!By-election !! Incumbent !! colspan=2|Party !! Reason !! Date !! Winner !! colspan=2|Party
|-
||Lyndhurst
|Tim Holding
|| 
|Labor
|Resigned
|27 April 2013
|Martin Pakula
|| 
|Labor
|-
||Melbourne
|Bronwyn Pike
|| 
|Labor
|Resigned
|21 July 2012
|Jennifer Kanis
|| 
|Labor
|-
||Niddrie
|Rob Hulls
|| 
|Labor
|Resigned
|24 March 2012
|Ben Carroll
|| 
|Labor
|-
||Broadmeadows
|John Brumby
|| 
|Labor
|Resigned following election loss
|19 February 2011
|Frank McGuire
|| 
|Labor
|-
|colspan=9 |

56th Legislative Assembly (2006–2010) 
|-
!By-election !! Incumbent !! colspan=2|Party !! Reason !! Date !! Winner !! colspan=2|Party
|-
||Altona
|Lynne Kosky
|| 
|Labor
|Resigned
|13 February 2010
|Jill Hennessy
|| 
|Labor
|-
||Kororoit
|Andre Haermeyer
|| 
|Labor
|Resigned
|28 June 2008
|Marlene Kairouz
|| 
|Labor
|-
||Williamstown
|Steve Bracks
|| 
|Labor
|Resigned as Premier
|15 September 2007
|Wade Noonan
|| 
|Labor
|-
||Albert Park
|John Thwaites
|| 
|Labor
|Resigned as Deputy Premier
|15 September 2007
|Martin Foley
|| 
|Labor
|-
|colspan=9 |

55th Legislative Assembly (2002–2006) 
|-
|colspan=9|No by-elections held
|-
|colspan=9|

54th Legislative Assembly (1999–2002) 
|-
!By-election !! Incumbent !! colspan=2|Party !! Reason !! Date !! Winner !! colspan=2|Party
|- bgcolor="pink"
||Benalla
|Pat McNamara
|| 
|National
|Resigned following election loss
|13 May 2000
|Denise Allen
|| 
|Labor
|- bgcolor="pink"
||Burwood
|Jeff Kennett
|| 
|Liberal
|Resigned following election loss
|11 December 1999
|Bob Stensholt
|| 
|Labor
|-
|colspan=9 |

53rd Legislative Assembly (1996–1999) 
|-
!By-election !! Incumbent !! colspan=2|Party !! Reason !! Date !! Winner !! colspan=2|Party
|-
||Northcote
|Tony Sheehan
|| 
|Labor
|Resigned
|15 August 1998
|Mary Delahunty
|| 
|Labor
|- bgcolor="pink"
||Mitcham
|Roger Pescott
|| 
|Liberal
|Resigned
|13 December 1997
|Tony Robinson
|| 
|Labor
|- bgcolor="#d0d0d0"
||Gippsland West
|Alan Brown
|| 
|Liberal
|Resigned
|1 February 1997
|Susan Davies
|| 
|Independent
|-
|colspan=9 |

52nd Legislative Assembly (1992–1996) 
|-
!By-election !! Incumbent !! colspan=2|Party !! Reason !! Date !! Winner !! colspan=2|Party
|-
||Williamstown
|Joan Kirner
|| 
|Labor
|Resigned
|13 August 1994
|Steve Bracks
|| 
|Labor
|-
||Coburg
|Tom Roper
|| 
|Labor
|Resigned
|14 May 1994
|Carlo Carli
|| 
|Labor
|-
||Broadmeadows
|Jim Kennan
|| 
|Labor
|Resigned
|18 September 1993
|John Brumby
|| 
|Labor
|-
|colspan=9 |

51st Legislative Assembly (1988–1992) 
|-
!By-election !! Incumbent !! colspan=2|Party !! Reason !! Date !! Winner !! colspan=2|Party
|-
||Shepparton
|Peter Ross-Edwards
|| 
|National
|Resigned
|19 October 1991
|Don Kilgour
|| 
|National
|-
||Thomastown
|Beth Gleeson
|| 
|Labor
|Died
|3 February 1990
|Peter Batchelor
|| 
|Labor
|-
||Greensborough
|Pauline Toner
|| 
|Labor
|Resigned due to ill health (cancer)
|15 April 1989
|Sherryl Garbutt
|| 
|Labor
|-
||Rodney
|Eddie Hann
|| 
|National
|Resigned
|4 March 1989
|Noel Maughan
|| 
|National
|-
|colspan=9 |

50th Legislative Assembly (1985–1988) 
|-
!By-election !! Incumbent !! colspan=2|Party !! Reason !! Date !! Winner !! colspan=2|Party
|-
||Ballarat North
|Tom Evans
|| 
|Liberal
|Resigned
|23 July 1988
|Steve Elder
|| 
|Liberal
|-
||Kew
|Prue Sibree
|| 
|Liberal
|Resigned
|19 March 1988
|Jan Wade
|| 
|Liberal
|-
|colspan=9 |

49th Legislative Assembly (1982–1985) 
|-
!By-election !! Incumbent !! colspan=2|Party !! Reason !! Date !! Winner !! colspan=2|Party
|- bgcolor="lightgreen"
||Swan Hill
|Alan Wood
|| 
|Liberal
|Resigned
|7 May 1983
|Barry Steggall
|| 
|National
|-
||Warrnambool
|Ian Smith
|| 
|Liberal
|Resigned in unsuccessful attempt to win Liberal preselection for the 1983 Wannon federal by-election even though he would have been required to resign if he had been successful at the preselection.
|7 May 1983
|Adam Kempton
|| 
|Liberal
|-
||Springvale
|Kevin King
|| 
|Labor
|Died
|19 March 1983
|Eddie Micallef
|| 
|Labor
|-
||Malvern
|Lindsay Thompson
|| 
|Liberal
|Resigned following defeat as Premier
|4 December 1982
|Geoff Leigh
|| 
|Liberal
|-
||Keilor
|Jack Ginifer
|| 
|Labor
|Resigned due to ill health
|17 July 1982
|George Seitz
|| 
|Labor
|-
|colspan=9 |

48th Legislative Assembly (1979–1982) 
|-
!By-election !! Incumbent !! colspan=2|Party !! Reason !! Date !! Winner !! colspan=2|Party
|-
||Kew
|Rupert Hamer
|| 
|Liberal
|Resigned following resignation as Premier
|15 August 1981
|Prue Sibree
|| 
|Liberal
|-
||Morwell
|Derek Amos
|| 
|Labor
|Resigned due to ill health
|27 June 1981
|Valerie Callister
|| 
|Labor
|-
|colspan=9 |

47th Legislative Assembly (1976–1979) 
|-
!By-election !! Incumbent !! colspan=2|Party !! Reason !! Date !! Winner !! colspan=2|Party
|-
||Richmond
|Clyde Holding
|| 
|Labor
|Resigned to enter federal politics at the 1977 federal election
|17 December 1977
|Theo Sidiropoulos
|| 
|Labor
|-
||Melbourne
|Barry Jones
|| 
|Labor
|Resigned to enter federal politics at the 1977 federal election
|17 December 1977
|Keith Remington
|| 
|Labor
|- bgcolor="pink"
||Greensborough
|Monte Vale
|| 
|Liberal
|Died
|5 November 1977
|Pauline Toner
|| 
|Labor
|-
|colspan=9 |

46th Legislative Assembly (1973–1976) 
|-
!By-election !! Incumbent !! colspan=2|Party !! Reason !! Date !! Winner !! colspan=2|Party
|-
||Brunswick East
|David Bornstein
|| 
|Labor
|Resigned
|12 April 1975
|Ron McAlister
|| 
|Labor
|-
||Greensborough
|Monte Vale
|| 
|Liberal
|Result overturned by the Court of Disputed Returns
|13 October 1973
|Monte Vale
|| 
|Liberal
|-
|colspan=9 |

45th Legislative Assembly (1970–1973) 
|-
!By-election !! Incumbent !! colspan=2|Party !! Reason !! Date !! Winner !! colspan=2|Party
|-
||Hampden
|Henry Bolte
|| 
|Liberal
|Resigned as Premier
|7 October 1972
|Tom Austin
|| 
|Liberal
|-
||Melbourne
|Arthur Clarey
|| 
|Labor
|Died
|9 June 1972
|Barry Jones
|| 
|Labor
|-
||Gisborne
|Julian Doyle
|| 
|Liberal
|Resigned
|11 December 1971
|Athol Guy
|| 
|Liberal
|-
||Kew
|Arthur Rylah
|| 
|Liberal
|Resigned due to ill health
|17 April 1971
|Rupert Hamer
|| 
|Liberal
|-
|colspan=9 |

44th Legislative Assembly (1967–1970) 
|-
!By-election !! Incumbent !! colspan=2|Party !! Reason !! Date !! Winner !! colspan=2|Party
|- bgcolor="pink"
||Dandenong
|Len Reid
|| 
|Liberal
|Resigned to enter federal politics at the 1969 federal election
|6 December 1969
|Alan Lind
|| 
|Labor
|-
||Swan Hill
|Harold Stirling
|| 
|Country
|Died
|14 September 1968
|Henry Broad
|| 
|Country
|-
|colspan=9 |

43rd Legislative Assembly (1964–1967) 
|-
!By-election !! Incumbent !! colspan=2|Party !! Reason !! Date !! Winner !! colspan=2|Party
|-
||Grant
|Roy Crick
|| 
|Labor
|Died
|8 October 1966
|Jack Ginifer
|| 
|Labor
|-
||Caulfield
|Alexander Fraser
|| 
|Liberal
|Died
|18 September 1965
|Ian McLaren
|| 
|Liberal
|-
|colspan=9 |

42nd Legislative Assembly (1961–1964) 
|-
!By-election !! Incumbent !! colspan=2|Party !! Reason !! Date !! Winner !! colspan=2|Party
|-
||Mildura
|Nathaniel Barclay
|| 
|Country
|Died
|27 October 1962
|Milton Whiting
|| 
|Country
|- bgcolor="pink"
||Broadmeadows
|Harry Kane
|| 
|Liberal and Country
|Died
|4 August 1962
|John Wilton
|| 
|Labor
|-
||Richmond
|Bill Towers
|| 
|Labor
|Died
|12 May 1962
|Clyde Holding
|| 
|Labor
|-
|colspan=9 |

41st Legislative Assembly (1958–1961) 
|-
!By-election !! Incumbent !! colspan=2|Party !! Reason !! Date !! Winner !! colspan=2|Party
|- bgcolor="lightblue"
||Ballarat North
|Russell White
|| 
|Country
|Resigned to take up position on the Trotting Control Board
|12 November 1960
|Tom Evans
|| 
|Liberal and Country
|-
||Scoresby
|George Knox
|| 
|Liberal and Country
|Died
|17 September 1960
|Bill Borthwick
|| 
|Liberal and Country
|-
||Footscray
|Ernie Shepherd
|| 
|Labor
|Died
|8 October 1958
|Bill Divers
|| 
|Labor
|-
|colspan=9 |

40th Legislative Assembly (1955–1958) 
|-
!By-election !! Incumbent !! colspan=2|Party !! Reason !! Date !! Winner !! colspan=2|Party
|-
||Northcote
|John Cain
|| 
|Labor
|Died
|21 September 1957
|Frank Wilkes
|| 
|Labor
|-
||Camberwell
|Robert Whately
|| 
|Liberal and Country
|Died in a car accident
|21 April 1956
|Vernon Wilcox
|| 
|Liberal and Country
|-
||Mornington
|William Leggatt
|| 
|Liberal and Country
|Resigned to take up appointment as Agent-General for Victoria in London
|3 March 1956
|Roberts Dunstan
|| 
|Liberal and Country
|-
||Flemington
|Jack Holland
|| 
|Labor
|Died
|18 February 1956
|Kevin Holland
|| 
|Labor
|-
|colspan=9 |

39th Legislative Assembly (1952–1955) 
|-
!By-election !! Incumbent !! colspan=2|Party !! Reason !! Date !! Winner !! colspan=2|Party
|-
||Malvern
|Trevor Oldham
|| 
|Liberal and Country
|Died
|11 July 1953
|John Bloomfield
|| 
|Liberal and Country
|-
|colspan=9 |

38th Legislative Assembly (1950–1952) 
|-
!By-election !! Incumbent !! colspan=2|Party !! Reason !! Date !! Winner !! colspan=2|Party
|-
||Toorak
|Edward Reynolds
|| 
|Liberal and Country
|Resigned
|13 September 1952
|Horace Petty
|| 
|Liberal and Country
|-
||Port Melbourne
|Tom Corrigan
|| 
|Labor
|Died
|13 September 1952
|Stan Corrigan
|| 
|Labor
|-
||Prahran
|Frank Crean
|| 
|Labor
|Resigned to enter federal politics at the 1951 federal election
|16 June 1951
|Robert Pettiona
|| 
|Labor
|-
||Ivanhoe
|Rupert Curnow
|| 
|Liberal and Country
|Died
|24 February 1951
|Frank Block
|| 
|Liberal and Country
|-
|colspan=9 |

37th Legislative Assembly (1947–1950) 
|-
!By-election !! Incumbent !! colspan=2|Party !! Reason !! Date !! Winner !! colspan=2|Party
|-
||Clifton Hill
|Jack Cremean
|| 
|Labor
|Resigned to enter federal politics at the 1949 federal election
|17 December 1949
|Joseph O'Carroll
|| 
|Labor
|-
||Kew
|Wilfrid Kent Hughes
|| 
|Liberal and Country
|Resigned to enter federal politics at the 1949 federal election
|17 December 1949
|Arthur Rylah
|| 
|Liberal and Country
|-
||Richmond
|Stan Keon
|| 
|Labor
|Resigned to enter federal politics at the 1949 federal election
|17 December 1949
|Frank Scully
|| 
|Labor
|-
||Brunswick
|James Jewell
|| 
|Labor
|Died
|16 July 1949
|Peter Randles
|| 
|Labor
|-
||Prahran
|Bill Quirk
|| 
|Labor
|Died
|22 January 1949
|Frank Crean
|| 
|Labor
|- bgcolor="lightblue"
||Geelong
|Fanny Brownbill
|| 
|Labor
|Died
|13 November 1948
|Edward Montgomery
|| 
|Liberal
|-
||Toorak
|Robert Bell Hamilton
|| 
|Liberal
|Died
|19 June 1948
|Edward Reynolds
|| 
|Liberal
|-
|colspan=9 |

36th Legislative Assembly (1945–1947) 
|-
!By-election !! Incumbent !! colspan=2|Party !! Reason !! Date !! Winner !! colspan=2|Party
|-
||Collingwood
|Tom Tunnecliffe
|| 
|Labor
|Resigned
|20 September 1947
|Bill Towers
|| 
|Labor
|-
||Benambra
|Roy Paton
|| 
|Country
|Died
|7 June 1947
|Thomas Mitchell
|| 
|Country
|-
|colspan=9 |

35th Legislative Assembly (1943–1945) 
|-
!By-election !! Incumbent !! colspan=2|Party !! Reason !! Date !! Winner !! colspan=2|Party
|- bgcolor="pink"
||Prahran
|John Ellis
|| 
|United Australia
|Died
|18 August 1945
|Bill Quirk
|| 
|Labor
|-
||Clifton Hill
|Herbert Cremean
|| 
|Labor
|Died
|7 July 1945
|Jack Cremean
|| 
|Labor
|-
||Bendigo
|Arthur Cook
|| 
|Labor
|Died
|26 May 1945
|Bill Galvin
|| 
|Labor
|-
||Lowan
|Hamilton Lamb
|| 
|Country
|Died in a Japanese prisoner of war camp on the Burma Railway
|4 November 1944
|Wilfred Mibus
|| 
|Country
|-
||Bulla and Dalhousie
|Reginald James
|| 
|Country
|Died
|27 September 1944
|Leslie Webster
|| 
|Country
|-
||Rodney
|William Dunstone
|| 
|Country
|Died
|12 April 1944
|Richard Brose
|| 
|Country
|-
||Waranga
|Ernest Coyle
|| 
|Country
|Died
|9 October 1943
|Wollaston Heily
|| 
|Country
|- bgcolor="pink"
||Nunawading
|Ivy Weber
|| 
|Independent
|Resigned in unsuccessful attempt to enter federal politics at the 1943 federal election
|4 September 1943
|Bob Gray
|| 
|Labor
|-
|colspan=9 |

34th Legislative Assembly (1940–1943) 
|-
!By-election !! Incumbent !! colspan=2|Party !! Reason !! Date !! Winner !! colspan=2|Party
|-
||Maryborough and Daylesford
|George Frost
|| 
|Labor
|Died
|28 November 1942
|Clive Stoneham
|| 
|Labor
|-
||Gippsland North
|Alexander Borthwick
|| 
|Country
|Died
|20 June 1942
|Bill Fulton
|| 
|Country
|-
||Port Melbourne
|James Murphy
|| 
|Labor
|Died
|18 April 1942
|Tom Corrigan
|| 
|Labor
|-
||Toorak
|Stanley Argyle
|| 
|United Australia
|Died
|11 January 1941
|Harold Thonemann
|| 
|United Australia
|- bgcolor="lightgreen"
||Polwarth
|Allan McDonald
|| 
|United Australia
|Resigned to enter federal politics at the 1940 federal election
|2 Nov 1940
|Edward Guye
|| 
|Country
|- bgcolor="#d0d0d0"
||Coburg
|Frank Keane
|| 
|Labor
|Died
|13 July 1940
|Charlie Mutton
|| 
|Independent Labor
|-
|colspan=9 |

33rd Legislative Assembly (1937–1940) 
|-
!By-election !! Incumbent !! colspan=2|Party !! Reason !! Date !! Winner !! colspan=2|Party
|-
||Hawthorn
|John Austin Gray
|| 
|United Australia
|Died
|10 June 1939
|Les Tyack
|| 
|United Australia
|- bgcolor="lightgreen"
||Gippsland North
|James Weir McLachlan
|| 
|Independent
|Died
|5 November 1938
|Alexander Borthwick
|| 
|Country
|-
||Geelong
|William Brownbill
|| 
|Labor
|Died
|4 June 1938
|Fanny Brownbill
|| 
|Labor
|-
||Ouyen
|Albert Bussau
|| 
|Country
|Resigned to take up appointment as Agent-General for Victoria in London
|5 May 1938
|Keith Dodgshun
|| 
|Country
|-
|colspan=9 |

32nd Legislative Assembly (1935–1937) 
|-
!By-election !! Incumbent !! colspan=2|Party !! Reason !! Date !! Winner !! colspan=2|Party
|- bgcolor="#d0d0d0"
||Benalla
|Edward Cleary
|| 
|Country
|Died
|3 October 1936
|Frederick Cook
|| 
|Independent
|-
||Goulburn Valley
|Murray Bourchier
|| 
|Country
|Resigned to take up appointment as Agent-General for Victoria in London
|19 September 1936
|John MacDonald
|| 
|Country
|-
||Rodney
|John Allan
|| 
|Country
|Died
|18 April 1936
|William Dunstone
|| 
|Country
|- bgcolor="pink"
||Allandale
|Thomas Parkin
|| 
|United Australia
|Died
|21 March 1936
|Patrick Denigan
|| 
|Labor
|-
|colspan=9 |

31st Legislative Assembly (1932–1935) 
|-
!By-election !! Incumbent !! colspan=2|Party !! Reason !! Date !! Winner !! colspan=2|Party
|-
||Nunawading
|Robert Menzies
|| 
|United Australia
|Resigned to enter federal politics at the 1934 federal election
|1 September 1934
|William Boyland
|| 
|United Australia
|-
||Clifton Hill
|Maurice Blackburn
|| 
|Labor
|Resigned to enter federal politics at the 1934 federal election
|20 August 1934
|Herbert Cremean
|| 
|Labor
|- bgcolor="#d0d0d0"
||Gunbower
|Henry Angus
|| 
|United Australia
|Died
|12 May 1934
|Norman Martin
|| 
|Independent Country
|-
||Allandale
|Alexander Peacock
|| 
|United Australia
|Died
|11 November 1933
|Millie Peacock
|| 
|United Australia
|-
||Warrnambool
|James Fairbairn
|| 
|United Australia
|Resigned to contest the 1933 Flinders federal by-election
|11 November 1933
|Keith McGarvie
|| 
|United Australia
|-
||Polwarth
|James McDonald
|| 
|United Australia
|Died
|16 September 1933
|Allan McDonald
|| 
|United Australia
|-
||Boroondara
|Richard Linton
|| 
|United Australia
|Resigned to take up appointment as Agent-General for Victoria in London
|29 April 1933
|Trevor Oldham
|| 
|United Australia
|- bgcolor="lightgreen"
||Benambra
|Henry Beardmore
|| 
|United Australia
|Died
|15 October 1932
|Roy Paton
|| 
|Country
|-
||Carlton
|Robert Solly
|| 
|Labor
|Died
|9 July 1932
|Bill Barry
|| 
|Labor
|-
|colspan=9 |

30th Legislative Assembly (1929–1932) 
|-
!By-election !! Incumbent !! colspan=2|Party !! Reason !! Date !! Winner !! colspan=2|Party
|- bgcolor="lightblue"
||Caulfield
|Frederick Forrest
|| 
|Progressive Liberal
|Died
|22 November 1930
|Harold Daniel Luxton
|| 
|Nationalist
|-
||Hawthorn
|William Murray McPherson
|| 
|Nationalist
|Resigned
|27 September 1930
|John Austin Gray
|| 
|Nationalist
|-
|colspan=9 |

29th Legislative Assembly (1927–1929) 
|-
!By-election !! Incumbent !! colspan=2|Party !! Reason !! Date !! Winner !! colspan=2|Party
|-
||Gippsland West
|Arthur Walter
|| 
|Country
|Resigned in unsuccessful bid for the federal seat of Indi at the 1929 election
|19 October 1929
|Matthew Bennett
|| 
|Country
|-
||Barwon
|Edward Morley
|| 
|Nationalist
|Died
|6 July 1929
|Thomas Maltby
|| 
|Nationalist
|-
||Castlemaine and Kyneton
|Harry Lawson
|| 
|Nationalist
|Resigned to contest a Senate seat at the 1929 federal election
|2 February 1929
|Walter Langslow
|| 
|Nationalist
|-
||Brighton
|Oswald Snowball
|| 
|Nationalist
|Died
|28 April 1928
|Ian MacFarlan
|| 
|Nationalist
|- bgcolor="lightblue"
||Gippsland South
|Henry Bodman
|| 
|Independent
|Died
|3 December 1927
|Walter West
|| 
|Nationalist
|-
|colspan=9 |

28th Legislative Assembly (1924–1927) 
|-
!By-election !! Incumbent !! colspan=2|Party !! Reason !! Date !! Winner !! colspan=2|Party
|-
||Flemington
|Edward Warde
|| 
|Labor
|Died
|9 December 1925
|Jack Holland
|| 
|Labor
|-
||Fitzroy
|John Billson
|| 
|Labor
|Died
|4 February 1925
|Maurice Blackburn
|| 
|Labor
|-
||Glenelg
|William Thomas
|| 
|Labor
|Died
|14 August 1924
|Ernie Bond
|| 
|Labor
|-
|colspan=9 |

27th Legislative Assembly (1921–1924) 
|-
!By-election !! Incumbent !! colspan=2|Party !! Reason !! Date !! Winner !! colspan=2|Party
|- bgcolor="lightgreen"
||Gippsland West
|Sir John Mackey
|| 
|Nationalist
|Died
|23 May 1924
|Arthur Walter
|| 
|VFU
|- bgcolor="pink"
||Dalhousie
|Allan Cameron
|| 
|Nationalist
|Died
|31 January 1924
|Reg Pollard
|| 
|Labor
|- bgcolor="pink"
||Daylesford
|Donald McLeod
|| 
|Nationalist
|Died
|8 July 1923
|Roderick McLeod 
|| 
|Labor
|-
||Gippsland South
|Thomas Livingston
|| 
|Nationalist
|Died
|18 August 1922
|Walter West
|| 
|Nationalist
|-
|colspan=9 |

26th Legislative Assembly (1920–1921) 
|-
!By-election !! Incumbent !! colspan=2|Party !! Reason !! Date !! Winner !! colspan=2|Party
|-
||Upper Goulburn
|Edwin Mackrell
|| 
|VFU
|Disqualified (failed to nominate on time)
|27 January 1921
|Edwin Mackrell
|| 
|VFU
|-
|colspan=9 |

25th Legislative Assembly (1917–1920) 
|-
!By-election !! Incumbent !! colspan=2|Party !! Reason !! Date !! Winner !! colspan=2|Party
|-
||Swan Hill
|Percy Stewart
|| 
|VFU
|Resigned to enter federal politics at the 1919 federal election
|19 November 1919
|Francis Old
|| 
|VFU
|-
||Albert Park
|Joseph Hannan
|| 
|Labor
|Resigned to enter federal politics at the 1919 federal election
|19 November 1919
|Arthur Wallace
|| 
|Labor
|-
||Albert Park
|George Elmslie
|| 
|Labor
|Died
|13 June 1918
|Joseph Hannan
|| 
|Labor
|-
|colspan=9 |

24th Legislative Assembly (1914–1917) 
|-
!By-election !! Incumbent !! colspan=2|Party !! Reason !! Date !! Winner !! colspan=2|Party
|-
||Geelong
|Robert Purnell
|| 
|Nationalist
|Disqualified (April by-election declared void)
|17 August 1917
|Robert Purnell
|| 
|Nationalist
|-
||Polwarth
|John Johnstone
|| 
|Nationalist
|Resigned
|13 July 1917
|James McDonald
|| 
|Nationalist
|-
||Benambra
|John Leckie
|| 
|Nationalist
|Resigned
|20 April 1917
|Henry Beardmore
|| 
|Nationalist
|-
||Geelong
|William Plain
|| 
|Nationalist
|Resigned to contest a Senate seat at the 1917 federal election
|20 April 1917
|Robert Purnell
|| 
|Nationalist
|-
||Warrnambool
|John Murray
|| 
|Commonwealth Liberal
|Died
|1 June 1916
|James Deany
|| 
|Commonwealth Liberal
|-
||Port Melbourne
|George Sangster
|| 
|Labor
|Died
|28 April 1915
|Owen Sinclair
|| 
|Labor
|-
||Bendigo East
|Alfred Hampson
|| 
|Labor
|Resigned to enter federal politics at the 1915 Bendigo by-election
|4 February 1915
|Luke Clough
|| 
|Labor
|-
|colspan=9 |

23rd Legislative Assembly (1911–1914) 
|-
!By-election !! Incumbent !! colspan=2|Party !! Reason !! Date !! Winner !! colspan=2|Party
|- bgcolor="pink"
||Essendon
|William Watt
|| 
|Nationalist
|Resigned to enter federal politics at the 1914 federal election
|23 July 1914
|Maurice Blackburn
|| 
|Labor
|-
||Gippsland South
|Thomas Livingston
|| 
|Nationalist
|Forfeited seat after joining Peacock Ministry
|30 June 1914
|Thomas Livingston
|| 
|Nationalist
|-
||Korong
|Thomas Langdon
| 
|Ministerialist
|Died
|26 June 1914
|Achilles Gray
| 
|Ministerialist
|-
||Borung
|William Hutchinson
|| 
|Commonwealth Liberal
|Forfeited seat after joining Watt Ministry
|15 January 1914
|William Hutchinson
|| 
|Commonwealth Liberal
|-
||Essendon
|William Watt
|| 
|Commonwealth Liberal
|Forfeited seat after forming Watt Ministry
|15 January 1914
|William Watt
|| 
|Commonwealth Liberal
|-
||Prahran
|Donald Mackinnon
|| 
|Commonwealth Liberal
|Forfeited seat after joining Watt Ministry
|15 January 1914
|Donald Mackinnon
|| 
|Commonwealth Liberal
|-
||Allandale
|Alexander Peacock
|| 
|Commonwealth Liberal
|Forfeited seat after joining Watt Ministry
|6 January 1914
|Alexander Peacock
|| 
|Commonwealth Liberal
|-
||Castlemaine and Maldon
|Harry Lawson
|| 
|Commonwealth Liberal
|Forfeited seat after joining Watt Ministry
|6 January 1914
|Harry Lawson
|| 
|Commonwealth Liberal
|-
||Warrnambool
|John Murray
|| 
|Commonwealth Liberal
|Forfeited seat after joining Watt Ministry
|6 January 1914
|John Murray
|| 
|Commonwealth Liberal
|-
||Benambra
|Albert Craven
|| 
|Commonwealth Liberal
|Died
|29 December 1913
|John Leckie
|| 
|Commonwealth Liberal
|-
||Albert Park
|George Elmslie
|| 
|Labor
|Forfeited seat after forming Elmslie Ministry
|20 December 1913
|George Elmslie
|| 
|Labor
|-
||Fitzroy
|John Billson
|| 
|Labor
|Forfeited seat after joining Elmslie Ministry
|20 December 1913
|John Billson
|| 
|Labor
|-
||Geelong
|William Plain
|| 
|Labor
|Forfeited seat after joining Elmslie Ministry
|20 December 1913
|William Plain
|| 
|Labor
|-
||Maryborough
|Alfred Outtrim
|| 
|Labor
|Forfeited seat after joining Elmslie Ministry
|20 December 1913
|Alfred Outtrim
|| 
|Labor
|-
||North Melbourne
|George Prendergast
|| 
|Labor
|Forfeited seat after joining Elmslie Ministry
|20 December 1913
|George Prendergast
|| 
|Labor
|-
||Williamstown
|John Lemmon
|| 
|Labor
|Forfeited seat after joining Elmslie Ministry
|20 December 1913
|John Lemmon
|| 
|Labor
|-
||Hawthorn
|George Swinburne
|| 
|Commonwealth Liberal
|Resigned to join the Inter-State Commission
|5 September 1913
|William McPherson
|| 
|Commonwealth Liberal
|-
||Grenville
|Charles McGrath
|| 
|Labor
|Resigned to contest the federal seat of Ballaraat at the 1913 election
|15 May 1913
|John Chatham
|| 
|Labor
|- bgcolor="lightblue"
||Kara Kara
|Peter McBride
| 
|
|Resigned to take up appointment as Agent-General for Victoria in London
|14 March 1913
|Jack Pennington
|| 
|Commonwealth Liberal
|-
||Allandale
|Alexander Peacock
|| 
|Commonwealth Liberal
|Forfeited seat after joining Watt Ministry
|6 March 1913
|Alexander Peacock
|| 
|Commonwealth Liberal
|- bgcolor="pink"
||Warrenheip
|George Holden
| 
|
|Resigned to become chairman of the Melbourne Harbor Trust
|28 February 1913
|Ned Hogan
|| 
|Labor
|-
||East Melbourne
|Alfred Farthing
|| 
|Commonwealth Liberal
|Election declared void
|1 October 1912
|Alfred Farthing
|| 
|Commonwealth Liberal
|-
||Abbotsford
|William Beazley
|| 
|Labor
|Died
|26 July 1912
|Gordon Webber
|| 
|Labor
|-
|colspan=9 |

22nd Legislative Assembly (1908–1911) 
|-
!By-election !! Incumbent !! colspan=2|Party !! Reason !! Date !! Winner !! colspan=2|Party
|-
||Waranga
|Martin Cussen
| 
|
|Died
|25 August 1911
|John Gordon
| 
|
|-
||Bendigo East
|Thomas Glass
|| 
|Labor
|Died
|16 June 1911
|Alfred Hampson
|| 
|Labor
|-
||Walhalla
|Albert Harris
| 
|
|Died
|29 July 1910
|Samuel Barnes
| 
|
|-
||Brunswick
|Frank Anstey
|| 
|Labor
|Resigned to contest the federal seat of Bourke at the 1910 election
|14 March 1910
|James Jewell
|| 
|Labor
|-
||Brighton
|Sir Thomas Bent
| 
|
|Died
|8 October 1909
|Oswald Snowball
| 
|
|-
||Goulburn Valley
|George Graham
|| 
|Commonwealth Liberal
|Forfeited seat after joining Murray Ministry
|29 January 1909
|George Graham
|| 
|Commonwealth Liberal
|-
||Kara Kara
|Peter McBride
|| 
|Commonwealth Liberal
|Forfeited seat after joining Murray Ministry
|29 January 1909
|Peter McBride
|| 
|Commonwealth Liberal
|-
||Ovens
|Alfred Billson
|| 
|Commonwealth Liberal
|Forfeited seat after joining Murray Ministry
|29 January 1909
|Alfred Billson
|| 
|Commonwealth Liberal
|-
||Rodney
|Hugh McKenzie
|| 
|Commonwealth Liberal
|Forfeited seat after joining Murray Ministry
|29 January 1909
|Hugh McKenzie
|| 
|Commonwealth Liberal
|-
||Warrnambool
|John Murray
|| 
|Commonwealth Liberal
|Forfeited seat after forming Murray Ministry
|29 January 1909
|John Murray
|| 
|Commonwealth Liberal
|-
|colspan=9 |

21st Legislative Assembly (1907–1908) 
|-
!By-election !! Incumbent !! colspan=2|Party !! Reason !! Date !! Winner !! colspan=2|Party
|-
||Mornington
|Alfred Downward
| 
|
|Forfeited seat after joining Bent Ministry
|17 November 1908
|Alfred Downward
| 
|
|-
||Upper Goulburn
|Thomas Hunt
| 
|
|Forfeited seat after joining Bent Ministry
|17 November 1908
|Thomas Hunt
| 
|
|-
||Wangaratta
|John Bowser
| 
|
|Forfeited seat after joining Bent Ministry
|17 November 1908
|John Bowser
| 
|
|-
||Carlton
|Frederick Bromley
|| 
|Labor
|Died
|23 October 1908
|Robert Solly
|| 
|Labor
|- bgcolor="pink"
||Richmond
|George Bennett
| 
|
|Died
|2 October 1908
|Ted Cotter
|| 
|Labor
|-
|colspan=9 |

20th Legislative Assembly (1904–1907) 
|-
!By-election !! Incumbent !! colspan=2|Party !! Reason !! Date !! Winner !! colspan=2|Party
|- bgcolor="#d0d0d0"
||Public Officers
|David Gaunson
|| 
|Labor
|resignation
|1 February 1907
|John Carter
| 
|
|-
||Korong
|Thomas Langdon
| 
|
|Forfeited seat after joining Bent Ministry
|25 January 1907
|Thomas Langdon
| 
|
|-
||East Melbourne
|Samuel Gillott
| 
|
|Resigned due to ill health
|8 January 1907
|Henry Weedon
| 
|
|-
||Toorak
|George Fairbairn
| 
|
|Resigned to enter federal politics at the 1906 federal election
|10 October 1906
|Norman Bayles
| 
|
|-
||Gippsland West
|John Mackey
| 
|
|Forfeited seat after joining Bent Ministry
|29 August 1906
|John Mackey
| 
|
|-
||Lowan
|William Irvine
| 
|
|Resigned to enter federal politics at the 1906 federal election
|20 July 1906
|Robert Stanley
| 
|
|-
||Barwon
|Jonas Levien
| 
|
|Died
|15 June 1906
|James Farrer
| 
|
|-
||Glenelg
|Ewen Cameron
| 
|
|Died
|11 May 1906
|Hugh Campbell
| 
|
|-
|colspan=9 |

19th Legislative Assembly (1902–1904) 
|-
!By-election !! Incumbent !! colspan=2|Party !! Reason !! Date !! Winner !! colspan=2|Party
|-
||Donald and Swan Hill
|John Taverner
| 
|
|Resigned to take up appointment as Agent-General for Victoria in London
|9 March 1904
|James Meldrum
| 
|
|-
||Daylesford
|Donald McLeod
| 
|
|Forfeited seat after joining Bent Ministry
|27 February 1904
|Donald McLeod
| 
|
|-
||Melbourne East
|Samuel Gillott
| 
|
|Forfeited seat after joining Bent Ministry
|27 February 1904
|Samuel Gillott
| 
|
|-
||East Bourke Boroughs
|Frederick Hickford
| 
|
|Resigned to contest a House seat at the 1903 federal election
|21 December 1903
|David Methven
| 
|
|- bgcolor="pink"
||Richmond
|William Trenwith
| 
|
|Resigned to enter federal politics at the 1903 federal election
|21 December 1903
|George Roberts
|| 
|Labor
|-
||Villiers and Heytesbury
|Gratton Wilson
| 
|
|Resigned to enter federal politics at the 1903 federal election
|21 December 1903
|John Glasgow
| 
|
|-
||Mandurang
|Maximilian Hirsch
| 
|
|Resigned to contest a House seat at the 1903 federal election
|15 December 1903
|William Webb
| 
|
|- bgcolor="pink"
||Melbourne West
|William Maloney
| 
|
|Resigned to enter federal politics at the 1903 federal election
|15 December 1903
|Tom Tunnecliffe
|| 
|Labor
|-
||Toorak
|Duncan Gillies
| 
|
|Died
|9 October 1903
|George Fairbairn
| 
|
|-
||Bourke West
|Samuel Staughton Jr.
| 
|
|Died
|6 March 1903
|Andrew Robertson
| 
|
|-
||Benalla and Yarrawonga
|William Hall
| 
|
|Died
|25 May 1903
|John Carlisle
| 
|
|-
||Anglesey
|Malcolm McKenzie
| 
|
|Resigned
|6 March 1903
|Thomas Hunt
| 
|
|-
|colspan=9 |

18th Legislative Assembly (1900–1902) 
|-
!By-election !! Incumbent !! colspan=2|Party !! Reason !! Date !! Winner !! colspan=2|Party
|-
||Gippsland East
|Henry Foster
| 
|
|Died
|27 June 1902
|James Cameron
| 
|
|-
||Anglesey
|Malcolm McKenzie
| 
|
|Forfeited seat after joining the Irvine Ministry
|18 June 1902
|Malcolm McKenzie
| 
|
|-
||Brighton
|Thomas Bent
| 
|
|Forfeited seat after joining the Irvine Ministry
|18 June 1902
|Thomas Bent
| 
|
|-
||Donald and Swan Hill
|John Taverner
| 
|
|Forfeited seat after joining the Irvine Ministry
|18 June 1902
|John Taverner
| 
|
|-
||Evelyn
|Ewen Cameron
| 
|
|Forfeited seat after joining the Irvine Ministry
|18 June 1902
|Ewen Cameron
| 
|
|-
||Lowan
|William Irvine
| 
|
|Forfeited seat after forming the Irvine Ministry
|18 June 1902
|William Irvine
| 
|
|-
||Normanby
|William Shiels
| 
|
|Forfeited seat after joining the Irvine Ministry
|18 June 1902
|William Shiels
| 
|
|-
||Warrnambool
|John Murray
| 
|
|Forfeited seat after joining the Irvine Ministry
|18 June 1902
|John Murray
| 
|
|-
||Footscray
|Jacob Fotheringham
| 
|
|Resigned
|14 June 1902
|Alexander McDonald
| 
|
|-
||Bourke West
|Samuel Staughton Sr.
| 
|
|Died
|14 September 1901
|Samuel Staughton Jr.
| 
|
|-
||Melbourne East
|John Anderson
| 
|
|Died
|16 July 1901
|John Deegan
| 
|
|- bgcolor="#d0d0d0"
||Melbourne
|Edward Findley
|| 
|Labor
|Expelled for seditious libel
|16 July 1901
|James Boyd
| 
|
|-
||Bogong
|Isaac Isaacs
| 
|
|Resigned to enter federal politics at the 1901 federal election
|24 June 1901
|Alfred Billson
| 
|
|-
||Benalla and Yarrawonga
|Thomas Kennedy
| 
|
|Resigned to enter federal politics at the 1901 federal election
|17 June 1901
|William Hall
| 
|
|-
||Fitzroy
|Robert Best
| 
|
|Resigned to enter federal politics at the 1901 federal election
|17 June 1901
|Patrick O'Connor
| 
|
|-
||Footscray
|Samuel Mauger
| 
|
|Resigned to enter federal politics at the 1901 federal election
|17 June 1901
|Jacob Fotheringham
| 
|
|-
||Gippsland North
|Allan McLean
| 
|
|Resigned to enter federal politics at the 1901 federal election
|17 June 1901
|Hubert Keogh
| 
|
|-
||Gunbower
|James McColl
| 
|
|Resigned to enter federal politics at the 1901 federal election
|17 June 1901
|John Cullen
| 
|
|-
||Talbot and Avoca
|Carty Salmon
| 
|
|Resigned to enter federal politics at the 1901 federal election
|17 June 1901
|George Mitchell
| 
|
|-
||Melbourne East
|Samuel Gillott
| 
|
|Forfeited seat after joining the Second Turner Ministry
|11 February 1901
|Samuel Gillott
| 
|
|-
||St Kilda
|George Turner
| 
|
|Resigned to enter federal politics at the 1901 federal election
|11 February 1901
|William Williams
| 
|
|-
||St Kilda
|George Turner
| 
|
|Forfeited seat after forming the Second Turner Ministry
|3 December 1900
|George Turner
| 
|
|-
||Bogong
|Isaac Isaacs
| 
|
|Forfeited seat after joining the Second Turner Ministry
|3 December 1900
|Isaac Isaacs
| 
|
|-
||Clunes and Allandale
|Alexander Peacock
| 
|
|Forfeited seat after joining the Second Turner Ministry
|27 November 1900
|Alexander Peacock
| 
|
|-
||Dunolly
|Daniel Duggan
| 
|
|Forfeited seat after joining the Second Turner Ministry
|27 November 1900
|Daniel Duggan
| 
|
|-
||Geelong
|William Gurr
| 
|
|Forfeited seat after joining the Second Turner Ministry
|27 November 1900
|William Gurr
| 
|
|-
||Richmond
|William Trenwith
| 
|
|Forfeited seat after joining the Second Turner Ministry
|27 November 1900
|William Trenwith
| 
|
|-
||Rodney
|John Morrissey
| 
|
|Forfeited seat after joining the Second Turner Ministry
|27 November 1900
|John Morrissey
| 
|
|-
||Stawell
|John Burton
| 
|
|Forfeited seat after joining the Second Turner Ministry
|27 November 1900
|John Burton
| 
|
|-
|colspan=9 |

17th Legislative Assembly (1897–1900) 
|-
!By-election !! Incumbent !! colspan=2|Party !! Reason !! Date !! Winner !! colspan=2|Party
|-
||Warrenheip
|Edward Murphy
| 
|
|Died
|11 May 1900
|George Holden
| 
|
|-
||Grenville
|George Russell
| 
|
|Resigned
|11 April 1900
|James Sadler
| 
|
|-
||Talbot and Avoca
|Carty Salmon
| 
|
|Forfeited seat after joining the McLean Ministry
|9 January 1900
|Carty Salmon
| 
|
|-
||Castlemaine
|James McCay
| 
|
|Forfeited seat after joining the McLean Ministry
|20 December 1899
|James McCay
| 
|
|-
||Melbourne North
|William Watt
| 
|
|Forfeited seat after joining the McLean Ministry
|20 December 1899
|William Watt
| 
|
|-
||Gunbower
|James McColl
| 
|
|Forfeited seat after joining the McLean Ministry
|13 December 1899
|James McColl
| 
|
|-
||Gippsland North
|Allan McLean
| 
|
|Forfeited seat after forming the McLean Ministry
|13 December 1899
|Allan McLean
| 
|
|-
||Lowan
|William Irvine
| 
|
|Forfeited seat after joining the McLean Ministry
|13 December 1899
|William Irvine
| 
|
|-
||Maryborough
|Alfred Outtrim
| 
|
|Forfeited seat after joining the McLean Ministry
|13 December 1899
|Alfred Outtrim
| 
|
|-
||Normanby
|William Shiels
| 
|
|Forfeited seat after joining the McLean Ministry
|13 December 1899
|William Shiels
| 
|
|-
||Numurkah and Nathalia
|George Graham
| 
|
|Forfeited seat after joining the McLean Ministry
|13 December 1899
|George Graham
| 
|
|-
||Footscray
|John Hancock
| 
|
|Died
|12 December 1899
|Samuel Mauger
| 
|
|-
||Grenville
|Michael Stapleton
| 
|
|Died
|1 December 1899
|David Kerr
| 
|
|-
||Melbourne East
|Ephraim Zox
| 
|
|Died
|7 November 1899
|Samuel Gillott
| 
|
|-
||Windermere
|William Anderson
| 
|
|Died
|3 June 1898
|John Spiers
| 
|
|-
|colspan=9 |

16th Legislative Assembly (1894–1897) 
|-
!By-election !! Incumbent !! colspan=2|Party !! Reason !! Date !! Winner !! colspan=2|Party
|-
||Kara Kara
|Andrew Anderson
| 
|
|Died
|11 May 1897
|Peter McBride
| 
|
|-
||Melbourne South
|Joseph Winter
| 
|
|Died
|26 May 1896
|John Tucker
| 
|
|-
||Villiers and Heytesbury
|Thomas Scott
| 
|
|Resigned
|26 May 1896
|John McArthur
| 
|
|-
||Castlemaine
|James Patterson
| 
|
|Died
|19 November 1895
|James McCay
| 
|
|-
||Mornington
|Alfred Downward
| 
|
|Election declared void
|26 January 1895
|Alfred Downward
| 
|
|-
||Ballarat West
|William Smith
| 
|
|Died
|5 November 1894
|Joseph Kirton
| 
|
|-
||Carlton South
|William Ievers
| 
|
|Died
|5 November 1894
|John Barrett
| 
|
|-
||Bogong
|Isaac Isaacs
| 
|
|Forfeited seat after joining the First Turner Ministry
|9 October 1894
|Isaac Isaacs
| 
|
|-
||Clunes and Allandale
|Alexander Peacock
| 
|
|Forfeited seat after joining the First Turner Ministry
|3 October 1894
|Alexander Peacock
| 
|
|-
||Donald and Swan Hill
|John Taverner
| 
|
|Forfeited seat after joining the First Turner Ministry
|3 October 1894
|John Taverner
| 
|
|-
||Eaglehawk
|Henry Williams
| 
|
|Forfeited seat after joining the First Turner Ministry
|3 October 1894
|Henry Williams
| 
|
|-
||Fitzroy
|Robert Best
| 
|
|Forfeited seat after joining the First Turner Ministry
|3 October 1894
|Robert Best
| 
|
|-
||Gippsland East
|Henry Foster
| 
|
|Forfeited seat after joining the First Turner Ministry
|3 October 1894
|Henry Foster
| 
|
|-
||Kilmore, Dalhousie and Lancefield
|John Duffy
| 
|
|Forfeited seat after joining the First Turner Ministry
|3 October 1894
|John Duffy
| 
|
|-
||St Kilda
|George Turner
| 
|
|Forfeited seat after forming the First Turner Ministry
|3 October 1894
|George Turner
| 
|
|-
|colspan=9 |

15th Legislative Assembly (1892–1894) 
|-
!By-election !! Incumbent !! colspan=2|Party !! Reason !! Date !! Winner !! colspan=2|Party
|-
||Portland
|Henry Wrixon
| 
|
|Resigned
|24 July 1894
|Donald McLeod
| 
|
|-
||Grenville
|David Davies
| 
|
|Died
|14 July 1894
|George Russell
| 
|
|-
||Eastern Suburbs
|Duncan Gillies
| 
|
|Resigned to take up appointment as Agent-General for Victoria in London
|25 January 1894
|Frank Madden
| 
|
|-
||Windermere
|Matthew Butterley
| 
|
|Died
|25 January 1894
|William Anderson
| 
|
|-
||Talbot and Avoca
|Robert Bowman
| 
|
|Died
|29 December 1893
|Carty Salmon
| 
|
|-
||Benalla and Yarrawonga
|John Templeton
| 
|
|Election declared void
|20 November 1893
|Thomas Kennedy
| 
|
|-
||Benalla and Yarrawonga
|James Campbell
| 
|
|Died
|9 October 1893
|John Templeton
| 
|
|-
||Lowan
|Richard Baker
| 
|
|Forfeited seat after joining the Patterson Ministry
|9 October 1893
|Richard Baker
| 
|
|-
||Sandhurst
|Robert Burrowes
| 
|
|Died
|6 October 1893
|Daniel Lazarus
| 
|
|-
||Creswick
|Richard Richardson
| 
|
|Forfeited seat after joining the Patterson Ministry
|28 August 1893
|Richard Richardson
| 
|
|-
||Mandurang
|John Highett
| 
|
|Died
|10 July 1893
|Richard O'Neill
| 
|
|-
||Bogong
|Isaac Isaacs
| 
|
|Resigned
|6 June 1893
|Isaac Isaacs
| 
|
|-
||Melbourne North
|David Wyllie
| 
|
|Died
|5 June 1893
|Sylvanus Reynolds
| 
|
|-
||Benalla and Yarrawonga
|James Campbell
| 
|
|Forfeited seat after joining the Patterson Ministry
|31 January 1893
|James Campbell
| 
|
|-
||Bogong
|Isaac Isaacs
| 
|
|Forfeited seat after joining the Patterson Ministry
|31 January 1893
|Isaac Isaacs
| 
|
|-
||Castlemaine
|James Patterson
| 
|
|Forfeited seat after forming the Patterson Ministry
|31 January 1893
|James Patterson
| 
|
|-
||Gunbower
|James McColl
| 
|
|Forfeited seat after joining the Patterson Ministry
|31 January 1893
|James McColl
| 
|
|-
||Kara Kara
|John Dow
| 
|
|Resigned due to insolvency
|31 January 1893
|John Dow
| 
|
|-
||Maldon
|John McIntyre
| 
|
|Forfeited seat after joining the Patterson Ministry
|31 January 1893
|John McIntyre
| 
|
|-
||Melbourne
|Godfrey Carter
| 
|
|Forfeited seat after joining the Patterson Ministry
|31 January 1893
|Godfrey Carter
| 
|
|-
||Port Fairy
|Bryan O'Loghlen
| 
|
|Forfeited seat after joining the Patterson Ministry
|31 January 1893
|Bryan O'Loghlen
| 
|
|-
||Rodney
|William Webb
| 
|
|Forfeited seat after joining the Patterson Ministry
|31 January 1893
|William Webb
| 
|
|-
||Dundas
|Samuel Samuel
| 
|
|Died
|18 August 1892
|John Thomson
| 
|
|-
||East Bourke Boroughs
|Graham Berry
| 
|
|Forfeited seat after joining the Shiels Ministry
|3 May 1892
|Graham Berry
| 
|
|-
|colspan=9 |

14th Legislative Assembly (1889–1892) 
|-
!By-election !! Incumbent !! colspan=2|Party !! Reason !! Date !! Winner !! colspan=2|Party
|-
||Benalla and Yarrawonga
|John Brock
| 
|
|Resigned
|2 April 1892
|Charles Kerville
| 
|
|-
||Geelong
|James Munro
| 
|
|Resigned to take up appointment as Agent-General for Victoria in London
|2 April 1892
|John Hopkins
| 
|
|-
||Clunes and Allandale
|Alexander Peacock
| 
|
|Forfeited seat after joining the Shiels Ministry
|3 March 1892
|Alexander Peacock
| 
|
|-
||Bourke East
|William Wilkinson
| 
|
|Died
|27 August 1891
|Robert Harper
| 
|
|-
||St Kilda
|George Turner
| 
|
|Forfeited seat after joining the Munro Ministry
|7 May 1891
|George Turner
| 
|
|-
||Collingwood
|George Langridge
| 
|
|Died
|17 April 1891
|John Hancock
| 
|
|-
||Collingwood
|George Langridge
| 
|
|Forfeited seat after joining the Munro Ministry
|20 November 1890
|George Langridge
| 
|
|-
||Daylesford
|James Wheeler
| 
|
|Forfeited seat after joining the Munro Ministry
|20 November 1890
|James Wheeler
| 
|
|-
||Geelong
|James Munro
| 
|
|Forfeited seat after forming the Munro Ministry
|20 November 1890
|James Munro
| 
|
|-
||Gippsland North
|Allan McLean
| 
|
|Forfeited seat after joining the Munro Ministry
|20 November 1890
|Allan McLean
| 
|
|-
||Kilmore, Dalhousie and Lancefield
|John Duffy
| 
|
|Forfeited seat after joining the Munro Ministry
|20 November 1890
|John Duffy
| 
|
|-
||Maryborough
|Alfred Outtrim
| 
|
|Forfeited seat after joining the Munro Ministry
|20 November 1890
|Alfred Outtrim
| 
|
|-
||Normanby
|William Shiels
| 
|
|Forfeited seat after joining the Munro Ministry
|20 November 1890
|William Shiels
| 
|
|-
||Numurkah and Nathalia
|George Graham
| 
|
|Forfeited seat after joining the Munro Ministry
|20 November 1890
|George Graham
| 
|
|-
||Kara Kara
|John Dow
| 
|
|Forfeited seat after joining the Gillies Ministry
|17 September 1890
|John Dow
| 
|
|-
||Villiers and Heytesbury
|William Anderson
| 
|
|Forfeited seat after joining the Gillies Ministry
|17 September 1890
|William Anderson
| 
|
|-
||Dunolly
|James Cheetham
| 
|
|Died
|22 July 1890
|William Tatchell
| 
|
|-
||Talbot and Avoca
|James Stewart
| 
|
|Died
|4 December 1889
|Robert Bowman
| 
|
|-
||Ballarat East
|James Russell
| 
|
|Died
|8 November 1889
|John Dunn
| 
|
|-
|colspan=9 |

13th Legislative Assembly (1886–1889) 
|-
!By-election !! Incumbent !! colspan=2|Party !! Reason !! Date !! Winner !! colspan=2|Party
|-
||Belfast
|John Madden
| 
|
|Died
|2 February 1888
|Bryan O'Loghlen
| 
|
|-
||Williamstown
|Alfred Clark
| 
|
|Resigned
|2 November 1887
|James Mirams
| 
|
|-
||Dalhousie
|George Sands
| 
|
|Died
|25 March 1887
|John Duffy
| 
|
|-
||Benambra
|Peter Wallace
| 
|
|Died
|15 June 1886
|Peter Wright
| 
|
|-
|colspan=9 |

12th Legislative Assembly (1883–1886) 
|-
!By-election !! Incumbent !! colspan=2|Party !! Reason !! Date !! Winner !! colspan=2|Party
|-
||Ovens
|George Kerferd
| 
|
|Resigned to take up appointment on the Supreme Court of Victoria
|15 January 1886
|Ferguson Tuthill
| 
|
|-
||Maryborough and Talbot
|Robert Bowman
| 
|
|Resigned
|22 December 1885
|Alfred Outtrim
| 
|
|-
||Melbourne West
|James Orkney
| 
|
|Resigned
|30 October 1885
|Godfrey Carter
| 
|
|-
||Avoca
|James Grant
| 
|
|Died
|24 April 1885
|George Bourchier
| 
|
|-
||Mandurang
|Hugh McColl
| 
|
|Died
|24 April 1885
|John Highett
| 
|
|-
||Moira
|Henry Bolton
| 
|
|Resigned
|2 May 1884
|George Graham
| 
|
|-
||Warrnambool
|James Francis
| 
|
|Died
|15 February 1884
|John Murray
| 
|
|-
||Emerald Hill
|Robert MacGregor
| 
|
|Died
|9 October 1883
|David Gaunson
| 
|
|-
||Sandhurst
|Robert Clark
| 
|
|Died
|15 May 1883
|Angus Mackay
| 
|
|-
||Barwon
|Jonas Levien
| 
|
|Forfeited seat after joining the Second Service Ministry
|24 March 1883
|Jonas Levien
| 
|
|-
||Bourke West
|Alfred Deakin
| 
|
|Forfeited seat after joining the Second Service Ministry
|24 March 1883
|Alfred Deakin
| 
|
|-
||Castlemaine
|James Service
| 
|
|Forfeited seat after forming the Second Service Ministry
|24 March 1883
|James Service
| 
|
|-
||Collingwood
|George Langridge
| 
|
|Forfeited seat after joining the Second Service Ministry
|24 March 1883
|George Langridge
| 
|
|-
||Fitzroy
|Albert Tucker
| 
|
|Forfeited seat after joining the Second Service Ministry
|24 March 1883
|Albert Tucker
| 
|
|-
||Geelong
|Graham Berry
| 
|
|Forfeited seat after joining the Second Service Ministry
|24 March 1883
|Graham Berry
| 
|
|-
||Ovens
|George Kerferd
| 
|
|Forfeited seat after joining the Second Service Ministry
|24 March 1883
|George Kerferd
| 
|
|-
||Rodney
|Duncan Gillies
| 
|
|Forfeited seat after joining the Second Service Ministry
|24 March 1883
|Duncan Gillies
| 
|
|-
||Melbourne North
|James Rose
| 
|
|Resigned
|21 March 1883
|James Rose
| 
|
|-
|colspan=9 |

11th Legislative Assembly (1880–1883) 
|-
!By-election !! Incumbent !! colspan=2|Party !! Reason !! Date !! Winner !! colspan=2|Party
|-
||Bourke East
|Robert Ramsay
| 
|
|Died
|13 June 1882
|Robert Harper
| 
|
|-
||Geelong
|Charles Kernot
| 
|
|Died
|18 April 1882
|Joseph Connor
| 
|
|-
||Boroondara
|Robert Smith
| 
|
|Resigned to take up appointment as Agent-General for Victoria in London
|23 February 1882
|William Walker
| 
|
|-
||Geelong
|Robert Johnstone
| 
|
|Died
|8 December 1881
|Robert Johnstone
| 
|
|-
||Fitzroy
|William Vale
| 
|
|Resigned
|6 December 1881
|Cuthbert Blackett
| 
|
|-
||Sandhurst
|Robert Burrowes
| 
|
|Forfeited seat after joining the O'Loghlen Ministry
|6 September 1881
|Robert Burrowes
| 
|
|-
||Wimmera
|Walter Madden
| 
|
|Forfeited seat after joining the O'Loghlen Ministry
|6 September 1881
|Walter Madden
| 
|
|-
||Polwarth and South Grenville
|William O'Hea
| 
|
|Died
|5 August 1881
|William Robertson
| 
|
|-
||Ararat
|David Gaunson
| 
|
|Forfeited seat after joining the O'Loghlen Ministry
|26 July 1881
|David Gaunson
| 
|
|-
||Avoca
|James Grant
| 
|
|Forfeited seat after joining the O'Loghlen Ministry
|26 July 1881
|James Grant
| 
|
|-
||Bourke West
|Bryan O'Loghlen
| 
|
|Forfeited seat after forming the O'Loghlen Ministry
|26 July 1881
|Bryan O'Loghlen
| 
|
|-
||Brighton
|Thomas Bent
| 
|
|Forfeited seat after joining the O'Loghlen Ministry
|26 July 1881
|Thomas Bent
| 
|
|-
||Delatite
|James Graves
| 
|
|Forfeited seat after joining the O'Loghlen Ministry
|26 July 1881
|James Graves
| 
|
|-
||Kyneton Boroughs
|Charles Young
| 
|
|Forfeited seat after joining the O'Loghlen Ministry
|26 July 1881
|Charles Young
| 
|
|-
||Moira
|Henry Bolton
| 
|
|Forfeited seat after joining the O'Loghlen Ministry
|26 July 1881
|Henry Bolton
| 
|
|-
||Melbourne North
|Joseph Storey
| 
|
|Died
|8 April 1881
|James Munro
| 
|
|-
||Maldon
|James Service
| 
|
|Resigned
|18 March 1881
|John McIntyre
| 
|
|-
||Melbourne East
|Alexander Smith
| 
|
|Died
|8 February 1881
|Frederick Walsh
| 
|
|-
||Ballarat West
|William Smith
| 
|
|Forfeited seat after joining the Third Berry Ministry
|18 August 1880
|William Smith
| 
|
|-
||Castlemaine
|James Patterson
| 
|
|Forfeited seat after joining the Third Berry Ministry
|18 August 1880
|James Patterson
| 
|
|-
||Collingwood
|George Langridge
| 
|
|Forfeited seat after joining the Third Berry Ministry
|18 August 1880
|George Langridge
| 
|
|-
||Creswick
|Richard Richardson
| 
|
|Forfeited seat after joining the Third Berry Ministry
|18 August 1880
|Richard Richardson
| 
|
|-
||Fitzroy
|William Vale
| 
|
|Forfeited seat after joining the Third Berry Ministry
|18 August 1880
|William Vale
| 
|
|-
||Geelong
|Graham Berry
| 
|
|Forfeited seat after forming the Third Berry Ministry
|18 August 1880
|Graham Berry
| 
|
|-
||Mandurang
|Henry Williams
| 
|
|Forfeited seat after joining the Third Berry Ministry
|18 August 1880
|Henry Williams
| 
|
|-
||Williamstown
|Alfred Clark
| 
|
|Forfeited seat after joining the Third Berry Ministry
|18 August 1880
|Alfred Clark
| 
|
|-
|colspan=9 |

10th Legislative Assembly (1880) 
|-
!By-election !! Incumbent !! colspan=2|Party !! Reason !! Date !! Winner !! colspan=2|Party
|-
||Bourke East
|Robert Ramsay
| 
|
|Forfeited seat after joining the First Service Ministry
|19 March 1880
|Robert Ramsay
| 
|
|-
||Brighton
|Thomas Bent
| 
|
|Forfeited seat after joining the First Service Ministry
|19 March 1880
|Thomas Bent
| 
|
|-
||Dalhousie
|John Duffy
| 
|
|Forfeited seat after joining the First Service Ministry
|19 March 1880
|John Duffy
| 
|
|-
||Maldon
|James Service
| 
|
|Forfeited seat after forming the First Service Ministry
|19 March 1880
|James Service
| 
|
|-
||Ovens
|George Kerferd
| 
|
|Forfeited seat after joining the First Service Ministry
|19 March 1880
|George Kerferd
| 
|
|-
||Rodney
|Duncan Gillies
| 
|
|Forfeited seat after joining the First Service Ministry
|19 March 1880
|Duncan Gillies
| 
|
|-
||Sandhurst
|Robert Clark
| 
|
|Forfeited seat after joining the First Service Ministry
|19 March 1880
|Robert Clark
| 
|
|-
||Sandridge
|John Madden
| 
|
|Forfeited seat after joining the First Service Ministry
|19 March 1880
|John Madden
| 
|
|-
|colspan=9 |

9th Legislative Assembly (1877–1880) 
|-
!By-election !! Incumbent !! colspan=2|Party !! Reason !! Date !! Winner !! colspan=2|Party
|-
||Villiers and Heytesbury
|Jeremiah Dwyer
| 
|
|Declared Insolvent
|16 December 1879
|Joseph Jones
| 
|
|-
||Carlton
|James Munro
| 
|
|Resigned
|2 December 1879
|James Munro
| 
|
|-
||Bourke West
|Alfred Deakin
| 
|
|Resigned
|22 August 1879
|Robert Harper
| 
|
|-
||Melbourne East
|Ephraim Zox
| 
|
|Resigned
|1 July 1879
|Ephraim Zox
| 
|
|-
||Fitzroy
|Robert MacGregor
| 
|
|Resigned
|25 June 1879
|Cuthbert Blackett
| 
|
|-
||Footscray
|Mark Last King
| 
|
|Died
|4 March 1879
|William Clark
| 
|
|-
||Bourke West
|John Smith
| 
|
|Died
|18 February 1879
|Alfred Deakin
| 
|
|-
||Dundas
|John MacPherson
| 
|
|Resigned
|29 July 1878
|John Serjeant
| 
|
|-
||Gippsland South
|George Macartney
| 
|
|Died
|19 June 1878
|Francis Mason
| 
|
|-
||Castlemaine
|James Farrell
| 
|
|Resigned
|7 June 1878
|Charles Pearson
| 
|
|-
||Warrnambool
|James McCulloch
| 
|
|Resigned
|21 May 1878
|James Francis
| 
|
|-
||Melbourne West
|Bryan O'Loghlen
| 
|
|Forfeited seat after joining the Second Berry Ministry
|11 April 1878
|Bryan O'Loghlen
| 
|
|-
||Melbourne West
|Charles MacMahon
| 
|
|Resigned
|4 February 1878
|Bryan O'Loghlen
| 
|
|-
||Boroondara
|George Smith
| 
|
|Died
|24 December 1877
|Robert Smith
| 
|
|-
||Rodney
|Duncan Gillies
| 
|
|Election declared void
|2 November 1877
|Duncan Gillies
| 
|
|-
||Gippsland South
|George Macartney
| 
|
|Election declared void
|24 August 1877
|George Macartney
| 
|
|-
||Sandhurst
|W. G. Blackham
| 
|
|Election declared void
|25 July 1877
|Angus Mackay
| 
|
|-
||Avoca
|James Grant
| 
|
|Forfeited seat after joining the Second Berry Ministry
|7 June 1877
|James Grant
| 
|
|-
||Ballarat West
|William Smith
| 
|
|Forfeited seat after joining the Second Berry Ministry
|7 June 1877
|William Smith
| 
|
|-
||Castlemaine
|James Patterson
| 
|
|Forfeited seat after joining the Second Berry Ministry
|7 June 1877
|James Patterson
| 
|
|-
||Geelong
|Graham Berry
| 
|
|Forfeited seat after forming the Second Berry Ministry
|7 June 1877
|Graham Berry
| 
|
|-
||Grant
|Peter Lalor
| 
|
|Forfeited seat after joining the Second Berry Ministry
|7 June 1877
|Peter Lalor
| 
|
|-
||Ripon and Hampden
|Francis Longmore
| 
|
|Forfeited seat after joining the Second Berry Ministry
|7 June 1877
|Francis Longmore
| 
|
|-
||Stawell
|John Woods
| 
|
|Forfeited seat after joining the Second Berry Ministry
|7 June 1877
|John Woods
| 
|
|-
|colspan=9 |

8th Legislative Assembly (1874–1877) 
|-
!By-election !! Incumbent !! colspan=2|Party !! Reason !! Date !! Winner !! colspan=2|Party
|-
||Gippsland North
|James McKean
| 
|
|Expelled
|17 August 1876
|Charles Duffy
| 
|
|-
||Sandridge
|David Thomas
| 
|
|Died
|27 July 1876
|John Madden
| 
|
|-
||Geelong East
|John Richardson
| 
|
|Died
|29 March 1876
|Charles Kernot
| 
|
|-
||Collingwood
|James Sullivan
| 
|
|Died
|22 February 1876
|James Mirams
| 
|
|-
||East Bourke Boroughs
|George Higinbotham
| 
|
|Resigned
|10 February 1876
|William Cook
| 
|
|-
||Villiers and Heytesbury
|Michael O'Grady
| 
|
|Died
|27 January 1876
|Joseph Jones
| 
|
|-
||Bourke East
|Robert Ramsay
| 
|
|Forfeited seat after joining the Fourth McCulloch Ministry
|8 November 1875
|Robert Ramsay
| 
|
|-
||Bourke West
|John Madden
| 
|
|Forfeited seat after joining the Fourth McCulloch Ministry
|8 November 1875
|Mark King
| 
|
|-
||Ballarat West
|Joseph Jones
| 
|
|Forfeited seat after joining the Fourth McCulloch Ministry
|6 November 1875
|George Fincham
| 
|
|-
||Warrnambool
|James McCulloch
| 
|
|Forfeited seat after forming the Fourth McCulloch Ministry
|6 November 1875
|James McCulloch
| 
|
|-
||Ararat
|William McLellan
| 
|
|Forfeited seat after joining the Fourth McCulloch Ministry
|2 November 1875
|William McLellan
| 
|
|-
||Dundas
|John MacPherson
| 
|
|Forfeited seat after joining the Fourth McCulloch Ministry
|2 November 1875
|John MacPherson
| 
|
|-
||Maryborough
|Duncan Gillies
| 
|
|Forfeited seat after joining the Fourth McCulloch Ministry
|2 November 1875
|Duncan Gillies
| 
|
|-
||Ovens
|George Kerferd
| 
|
|Forfeited seat after joining the Fourth McCulloch Ministry
|2 November 1875
|George Kerferd
| 
|
|-
||Avoca
|James Grant
| 
|
|Forfeited seat after joining the First Berry Ministry
|20 August 1875
|James Grant
| 
|
|-
||Ballarat West
|William Smith
| 
|
|Forfeited seat after joining the First Berry Ministry
|20 August 1875
|William Smith
| 
|
|-
||Castlemaine
|James Patterson
| 
|
|Forfeited seat after joining the First Berry Ministry
|20 August 1875
|James Patterson
| 
|
|-
||Crowlands
|John Woods
| 
|
|Forfeited seat after joining the First Berry Ministry
|20 August 1875
|John Woods
| 
|
|-
||Geelong West
|Graham Berry
| 
|
|Forfeited seat after forming the First Berry Ministry
|20 August 1875
|Graham Berry
| 
|
|-
||Grant South
|Peter Lalor
| 
|
|Forfeited seat after joining the First Berry Ministry
|20 August 1875
|Peter Lalor
| 
|
|-
||Melbourne North
|James Munro
| 
|
|Forfeited seat after joining the First Berry Ministry
|20 August 1875
|James Munro
| 
|
|-
||Ripon and Hampden
|Francis Longmore
| 
|
|Forfeited seat after joining the First Berry Ministry
|20 August 1875
|Francis Longmore
| 
|
|-
||Ararat
|Michael Carroll
| 
|
|Forfeited seat
|19 March 1875
|David Gaunson
| 
|
|-
||Gippsland North
|Frederick Smyth
| 
|
|Resigned
|19 March 1875
|James McKean
| 
|
|-
||Richmond
|James Francis
| 
|
|Resigned
|8 December 1874
|Joseph Bosisto
| 
|
|-
||Bourke East
|Robert Ramsay
| 
|
|Forfeited seat after joining the Kerferd Ministry
|18 August 1874
|Robert Ramsay
| 
|
|-
||Ballarat East
|Townsend McDermott
| 
|
|Forfeited seat after joining the Kerferd Ministry
|12 August 1874
|Townsend McDermott
| 
|
|-
||Maldon
|James Service
| 
|
|Forfeited seat after joining the Kerferd Ministry
|12 August 1874
|James Service
| 
|
|-
||Grenville
|Mark Pope
| 
|
|Died
|31 July 1874
|Richard Lock
| 
|
|-
||Collingwood
|John Everard
| 
|
|Resigned
|29 July 1874
|George Langridge
| 
|
|-
||St Kilda
|James Stephen
| 
|
|Resigned to take up appointment on the Supreme Court of Victoria
|15 May 1874
|Edward Dixon
| 
|
|-
|colspan=9 |

7th Legislative Assembly (1871–1874) 
|-
!By-election !! Incumbent !! colspan=2|Party !! Reason !! Date !! Winner !! colspan=2|Party
|-
||Ovens
|George Kerferd
| 
|
|Forfeited seat after joining the Francis Ministry
|11 May 1874
|George Kerferd
| 
|
|-
||East Bourke Boroughs
|William Champ
| 
|
|Resigned
|26 May 1873
|George Higinbotham
| 
|
|-
||Portland
|Howard Spensley
| 
|
|Resigned
|20 May 1873
|Thomas Must
| 
|
|-
||Grenville
|Thomas Russell
| 
|
|Resigned
|24 February 1873
|John Montgomery
| 
|
|-
||St Kilda
|Thomas Fellows
| 
|
|Resigned to take up appointment on the Supreme Court of Victoria
|13 January 1873
|Robert Murray Smith
| 
|
|-
||Murray
|William Witt
| 
|
|Resigned
|8 July 1872
|John Orr
| 
|
|-
||Mandurang
|James Casey
| 
|
|Forfeited seat after joining the Francis Ministry
|26 June 1872
|James Casey
| 
|
|-
||Maryborough
|Duncan Gillies
| 
|
|Forfeited seat after joining the Francis Ministry
|26 June 1872
|Duncan Gillies
| 
|
|-
||Melbourne East
|Edward Cohen
| 
|
|Forfeited seat after joining the Francis Ministry
|26 June 1872
|Edward Cohen
| 
|
|-
||Melbourne West
|Edward Langton
| 
|
|Forfeited seat after joining the Francis Ministry
|26 June 1872
|Edward Langton
| 
|
|-
||Ovens
|George Kerferd
| 
|
|Forfeited seat after joining the Francis Ministry
|26 June 1872
|George Kerferd
| 
|
|-
||Richmond
|James Francis
| 
|
|Forfeited seat after forming the Francis Ministry
|26 June 1872
|James Francis
| 
|
|-
||St Kilda
|James Stephen
| 
|
|Forfeited seat after joining the Francis Ministry
|26 June 1872
|James Stephen
| 
|
|-
||Sandhurst
|Angus Mackay
| 
|
|Forfeited seat after joining the Francis Ministry
|26 June 1872
|Angus Mackay
| 
|
|-
||Mornington
|James McCulloch
| 
|
|Resigned
|26 March 1872
|James Purves
| 
|
|-
||Collingwood
|William Vale
| 
|
|Forfeited seat after joining the Duffy Ministry
|9 December 1871
|William Vale
| 
|
|-
||Ballarat East
|Robert Walsh
| 
|
|Forfeited seat after joining the Duffy Ministry
|18 July 1871
|Robert Walsh
| 
|
|-
||Ararat
|William McLellan
| 
|
|Forfeited seat after joining the Duffy Ministry
|30 June 1871
|William McLellan
| 
|
|-
||Avoca
|James Grant
| 
|
|Forfeited seat after joining the Duffy Ministry
|30 June 1871
|James Grant
| 
|
|-
||Dalhousie
|Charles Duffy
| 
|
|Forfeited seat after forming the Duffy Ministry
|30 June 1871
|Charles Duffy
| 
|
|-
||Geelong West
|Graham Berry
| 
|
|Forfeited seat after joining the Duffy Ministry
|30 June 1871
|Graham Berry
| 
|
|-
||Portland
|Howard Spensley
| 
|
|Forfeited seat after joining the Duffy Ministry
|30 June 1871
|Howard Spensley
| 
|
|-
||Ripon and Hampden
|Francis Longmore
| 
|
|Forfeited seat after joining the Duffy Ministry
|30 June 1871
|Francis Longmore
| 
|
|-
||Villiers and Heytesbury
|Michael O'Grady
| 
|
|Forfeited seat after joining the Duffy Ministry
|30 June 1871
|Michael O'Grady
| 
|
|-
|colspan=9 |

6th Legislative Assembly (1868–1871) 
|-
!By-election !! Incumbent !! colspan=2|Party !! Reason !! Date !! Winner !! colspan=2|Party
|-
||Creswick
|William Frazer
| 
|
|Died
|30 December 1870
|James Stewart
| 
|
|-
||Castlemaine
|William Baillie
| 
|
|Resigned
|5 December 1870
|James Patterson
| 
|
|-
||Bourke East
|Matthew McCaw
| 
|
|Resigned
|24 September 1870
|Robert Ramsay
| 
|
|-
||St Kilda
|Butler Aspinall
| 
|
|Resigned
|13 September 1870
|James Stephen
| 
|
|-
||Avoca
|James Grant
| 
|
|Resigned
|25 July 1870
|Peter Finn
| 
|
|-
||Villiers and Heytesbury
|Morgan McDonnell
| 
|
|Resigned
|25 July 1870
|Michael O'Grady
| 
|
|-
||Geelong West
|James Carr
| 
|
|Resigned
|6 May 1870
|Robert Johnstone
| 
|
|-
||Ballarat West
|John James
| 
|
|Resigned
|30 April 1870
|Archibald Michie
| 
|
|-
||Ararat
|William Wilson
| 
|
|Forfeited seat after joining the Third McCulloch Ministry
|26 April 1870
|William Wilson
| 
|
|-
||Dundas
|Alexander MacPherson
| 
|
|Forfeited seat after joining the Third McCulloch Ministry
|26 April 1870
|Alexander MacPherson
| 
|
|-
||Belfast
|Henry Wrixon
| 
|
|Forfeited seat after joining the Third McCulloch Ministry
|25 April 1870
|Henry Wrixon
| 
|
|-
||Collingwood
|William Bates
| 
|
|Forfeited seat after joining the Third McCulloch Ministry
|25 April 1870
|William Bates
| 
|
|-
||Mornington
|James McCulloch
| 
|
|Forfeited seat after forming the Third McCulloch Ministry
|25 April 1870
|James McCulloch
| 
|
|-
||Richmond
|James Francis
| 
|
|Forfeited seat after joining the Third McCulloch Ministry
|25 April 1870
|James Francis
| 
|
|-
||Sandhurst
|Angus Mackay
| 
|
|Forfeited seat after joining the Third McCulloch Ministry
|25 April 1870
|Angus Mackay
| 
|
|-
||Maryborough
|Robert Bowman
| 
|
|Resigned
|29 March 1870
|Duncan Gillies
| 
|
|-
||Geelong West
|Graham Berry
| 
|
|Forfeited seat after joining the MacPherson Ministry
|7 February 1870
|Graham Berry
| 
|
|-
||St Kilda
|Butler Aspinall
| 
|
|Forfeited seat after joining the MacPherson Ministry
|1 February 1870
|Butler Aspinall
| 
|
|-
||Ararat
|William McLellan
| 
|
|Forfeited seat after joining the MacPherson Ministry
|29 January 1870
|William McLellan
| 
|
|-
||Crowlands
|Robert Byrne
| 
|
|Forfeited seat after joining the MacPherson Ministry
|9 October 1869
|George Rolfe
| 
|
|-
||Ripon and Hampden
|Francis Longmore
| 
|
|Forfeited seat after joining the MacPherson Ministry
|9 October 1869
|Francis Longmore
| 
|
|-
||Villiers and Heytesbury
|Morgan McDonnell
| 
|
|Forfeited seat after joining the MacPherson Ministry
|9 October 1869
|Morgan McDonnell
| 
|
|-
||Dundas
|John MacPherson
| 
|
|Forfeited seat after forming the MacPherson Ministry
|8 October 1869
|John MacPherson
| 
|
|-
||Bourke West
|John Smith
| 
|
|Forfeited seat after joining the MacPherson Ministry
|7 October 1869
|John Smith
| 
|
|-
||Maryborough
|James McKean
| 
|
|Forfeited seat after joining the MacPherson Ministry
|7 October 1869
|James McKean
| 
|
|-
||Collingwood
|Isaac Reeves
| 
|
|Forfeited seat after joining the MacPherson Ministry
|5 October 1869
|William Vale
| 
|
|-
||Melbourne East
|Edward Cohen
| 
|
|Forfeited seat after joining the MacPherson Ministry
|5 October 1869
|Edward Cohen
| 
|
|-
||Ararat
|William Wilson
| 
|
|Forfeited seat after joining the Second McCulloch Ministry
|14 September 1869
|William Wilson
| 
|
|-
||Ballarat West
|William Vale
| 
|
|Resigned
|23 May 1869
|John James
| 
|
|-
||Ballarat West
|Charles Jones
| 
|
|Expelled for Corruption
|10 May 1869
|Charles Jones
| 
|
|-
||Portland
|James Butters
| 
|
|Expelled for Bribery
|5 May 1869
|James Butters
| 
|
|-
||Ballarat West
|Charles Jones
| 
|
|Expelled for Bribery
|27 March 1869
|Charles Jones
| 
|
|-
||Gipps Land South
|Thomas McCombie
| 
|
|Resigned
|19 March 1869
|George Macartney
| 
|
|-
||Castlemaine
|Samuel Bindon
| 
|
|Resigned
|30 October 1868
|Richard Kitto
| 
|
|-
||Geelong West
|Nicholas Foott
| 
|
|Died
|16 October 1868
|Graham Berry
| 
|
|-
||Bourke East
|James Balfour
| 
|
|Resigned
|29 August 1868
|William Lobb
| 
|
|-
||Ovens
|George Smith
| 
|
|Forfeited seat after joining the Second McCulloch Ministry
|1 August 1868
|George Smith
| 
|
|-
||Ballarat West
|Charles Jones
| 
|
|Forfeited seat after joining the Second McCulloch Ministry
|30 July 1868
|Charles Jones
| 
|
|-
||Ballarat West
|William Vale
| 
|
|Forfeited seat after joining the Second McCulloch Ministry
|30 July 1868
|William Vale
| 
|
|-
||Bourke South
|George Smith
| 
|
|Forfeited seat after joining the Second McCulloch Ministry
|30 July 1868
|George Smith
| 
|
|-
||Mornington
|James McCulloch
| 
|
|Forfeited seat after forming the Second McCulloch Ministry
|30 July 1868
|James McCulloch
| 
|
|-
||Avoca
|James Grant
| 
|
|Forfeited seat after joining the Second McCulloch Ministry
|25 July 1868
|James Grant
| 
|
|-
||Mandurang
|James Casey
| 
|
|Forfeited seat after joining the Second McCulloch Ministry
|25 July 1868
|James Casey
| 
|
|-
||Mandurang
|James Sullivan
| 
|
|Forfeited seat after joining the Second McCulloch Ministry
|25 July 1868
|James Sullivan
| 
|
|-
||Emerald Hill
|George Verdon
| 
|
|Resigned to take up appointment as Agent-General for Victoria in London
|17 June 1868
|John Whiteman
| 
|
|-
||Ovens
|George Kerferd
| 
|
|Forfeited seat after joining the Sladen Ministry
|27 May 1868
|George Kerferd
| 
|
|-
||Villiers and Heytesbury
|William Bayles
| 
|
|Forfeited seat after joining the Sladen Ministry
|27 May 1868
|William Bayles
| 
|
|-
||Villiers and Heytesbury
|Morgan McDonnell
| 
|
|Forfeited seat after joining the Sladen Ministry
|27 May 1868
|Morgan McDonnell
| 
|
|-
||Ballarat West
|Duncan Gillies
| 
|
|Forfeited seat after joining the Sladen Ministry
|25 May 1868
|Charles Jones
| 
|
|-
||Bourke South
|Michael O'Grady
| 
|
|Forfeited seat after joining the Sladen Ministry
|25 May 1868
|John Crews
| 
|
|-
||Melbourne West
|Edward Langton
| 
|
|Forfeited seat after joining the Sladen Ministry
|19 May 1868
|Edward Langton
| 
|
|-
||St Kilda
|Thomas Fellows
| 
|
|Forfeited seat after joining the Sladen Ministry
|19 May 1868
|Thomas Fellows
| 
|
|-
|colspan=9 |

5th Legislative Assembly (1866–1868) 
|-
!By-election !! Incumbent !! colspan=2|Party !! Reason !! Date !! Winner !! colspan=2|Party
|-
||Grant South
|William McCann
| 
|
|Imprisoned for Forgery
|13 September 1867
|William Stutt
| 
|
|-
||Dalhousie
|George Sands
| 
|
|Resigned
|12 August 1867
|Charles Duffy
| 
|
|-
||Maldon
|John Ramsay
| 
|
|Died
|14 June 1867
|William Williams
| 
|
|-
||Mandurang
|James Sullivan
| 
|
|Forfeited seat after joining the First McCulloch Ministry
|25 March 1867
|James Sullivan
| 
|
|-
||Richmond
|Archibald Wardrop
| 
|
|Resigned
|25 September 1866
|Ambrose Kyte
| 
|
|-
||Ballarat West
|William Vale
| 
|
|Forfeited seat after joining the First McCulloch Ministry
|6 August 1866
|William Vale
| 
|
|-
||Castlemaine
|Samuel Bindon
| 
|
|Forfeited seat after joining the First McCulloch Ministry
|1 August 1866
|Samuel Bindon
| 
|
|-
||Rodney
|John MacGregor
| 
|
|Forfeited seat after joining the First McCulloch Ministry
|1 August 1866
|John MacGregor
| 
|
|-
|colspan=9 |

4th Legislative Assembly (1864–1866) 
|-
!By-election !! Incumbent !! colspan=2|Party !! Reason !! Date !! Winner !! colspan=2|Party
|-
||Ballarat West
|William Vale
| 
|
|Forfeited seat after joining the First McCulloch Ministry
|11 September 1865
|William Vale
| 
|
|-
|colspan=9 |

3rd Legislative Assembly (1861–1864) 
|-
!By-election !! Incumbent !! colspan=2|Party !! Reason !! Date !! Winner !! colspan=2|Party
|-
||East Bourke Boroughs
|Richard Heales
| 
|
|Died
|9 July 1864
|Edward Cope
| 
|
|-
||Villiers and Heytesbury
|Richard Ireland
| 
|
|Resigned
|19 May 1864
|Samuel MacGregor
| 
|
|-
||Gipps Land North
|George Mackay
| 
|
|Resigned
|11 April 1864
|John Everard
| 
|
|-
||Ballarat West
|William Smith
| 
|
|Resigned
|4 February 1864
|Robert Lewis
| 
|
|-
||Mandurang
|John Owens
| 
|
|Resigned
|12 August 1863
|James Casey
| 
|
|-
||Polwarth and South Grenville
|William Nixon
| 
|
|Resigned
|27 July 1863
|Archibald Michie
| 
|
|-
||Avoca
|James Grant
| 
|
|Forfeited seat after joining the First McCulloch Ministry
|18 July 1863
|James Grant
| 
|
|-
||Mandurang
|James Sullivan
| 
|
|Forfeited seat after joining the First McCulloch Ministry
|15 July 1863
|James Sullivan
| 
|
|-
||Mornington
|James McCulloch
| 
|
|Forfeited seat after forming the First McCulloch Ministry
|15 July 1863
|James McCulloch
| 
|
|-
||East Bourke Boroughs
|Richard Heales
| 
|
|Forfeited seat after joining the First McCulloch Ministry
|11 July 1863
|Richard Heales
| 
|
|-
||Richmond
|James Francis
| 
|
|Forfeited seat after joining the First McCulloch Ministry
|10 July 1863
|James Francis
| 
|
|-
||Brighton
|George Higinbotham
| 
|
|Forfeited seat after joining the First McCulloch Ministry
|9 July 1863
|George Higinbotham
| 
|
|-
||Williamstown
|George Verdon
| 
|
|Forfeited seat after joining the First McCulloch Ministry
|9 July 1863
|George Verdon
| 
|
|-
||Bourke South
|Louis Smith
| 
|
|Resigned
|3 June 1863
|Louis Smith
| 
|
|-
||Evelyn
|William Jones
| 
|
|Resigned
|5 May 1863
|John Thompson
| 
|
|-
||Rodney
|Wilson Gray
| 
|
|Resigned
|3 November 1862
|John MacGregor
| 
|
|-
||Gipps Land South
|George Hedley
| 
|
|Resigned
|24 October 1862
|John Johnson
| 
|
|-
||Sandhurst
|William Denova
| 
|
|Resigned
|30 August 1862
|Robert Strickland
| 
|
|-
||Ripon and Hampden
|James Service
| 
|
|Resigned
|29 August 1862
|George Morton
| 
|
|-
||Castlemaine
|Vincent Pyke
| 
|
|Resigned
|10 July 1862
|George Smyth
| 
|
|-
||Ararat
|Daniel Flint
| 
|
|Resigned
|10 April 1862
|Tharp Girdlestone
| 
|
|-
||Brighton
|William Brodribb
| 
|
|Resigned
|7 April 1862
|George Higinbotham
| 
|
|-
||Grenville
|Robert Gillespie
| 
|
|Resigned
|17 March 1862
|Mark Pope
| 
|
|-
||Mornington
|Henry Chapman
| 
|
|Resigned
|24 February 1862
|James McCulloch
| 
|
|-
||Maryborough
|George Evans
| 
|
|Forfeited seat after joining the Third O'Shanassy Ministry
|13 January 1862
|George Evans
| 
|
|-
||Portland
|William Haines
| 
|
|Forfeited seat after joining the Third O'Shanassy Ministry
|10 December 1861
|William Haines
| 
|
|-
||Villiers and Heytesbury
|Charles Duffy
| 
|
|Forfeited seat after joining the Third O'Shanassy Ministry
|3 December 1861
|Charles Duffy
| 
|
|-
||Villiers and Heytesbury
|Richard Ireland
| 
|
|Forfeited seat after joining the Third O'Shanassy Ministry
|3 December 1861
|Richard Ireland
| 
|
|-
||Warrnambool
|Thomas Manifold
| 
|
|Resigned
|3 December 1861
|John Wood
| 
|
|-
||St Kilda
|James Johnston
| 
|
|Forfeited seat after joining the Third O'Shanassy Ministry
|28 November 1861
|James Johnston
| 
|
|-
||Emerald Hill
|Robert Anderson
| 
|
|Forfeited seat after joining the Third O'Shanassy Ministry
|27 November 1861
|Robert Anderson
| 
|
|-
||Kilmore
|John O'Shanassy
| 
|
|Forfeited seat after forming the Third O'Shanassy Ministry
|27 November 1861
|John O'Shanassy
| 
|
|-
||Melbourne North
|Patrick Costello
| 
|
|Expelled for Electoral Fraud
|18 November 1861
|John Sinclair
| 
|
|-
||Castlemaine
|James Chapman
| 
|
|Disqualified
|November 1861
|Alexander Smith
| 
|
|-
||Gipps Land North
|John Everard
| 
|
|Declared Insolvent
|24 October 1861
|George Mackay
| 
|
|-
||Maryborough
|Richard Ireland
| 
|
|Resigned
|21 October 1861
|George Evans
| 
|
|-
|colspan=9 |

2nd Legislative Assembly (1859–1861) 
|-
!By-election !! Incumbent !! colspan=2|Party !! Reason !! Date !! Winner !! colspan=2|Party
|-
||Melbourne East
|Alexander Hunter
| 
|
|Resigned
|2 July 1861
|Graham Berry
| 
|
|-
||Mandurang
|James Sullivan
| 
|
|Forfeited seat after joining the Heales Ministry
|26 June 1861
|James Sullivan
| 
|
|-
||Mandurang
|George Brodie
| 
|
|Resigned
|10 June 1861
|James Sullivan
| 
|
|-
||Crowlands
|John Houston
| 
|
|Forfeited seat after joining the Heales Ministry
|10 June 1861
|John Houston
| 
|
|-
||Brighton
|Charles Ebden
| 
|
|Resigned
|20 May 1861
|George Higinbotham
| 
|
|-
||Castlemaine
|John Macadam
| 
|
|Forfeited seat after joining the Heales Ministry
|13 May 1861
|Alexander Smith
| 
|
|-
||Wimmera
|Robert Firebrace
| 
|
|Resigned
|18 May 1861
|Samuel Wilson
| 
|
|-
||Villiers and Heytesbury
|Alexander Russell
| 
|
|Resigned
|1 April 1861
|William Rutledge
| 
|
|-
||Melbourne West
|Thomas Loader
| 
|
|Forfeited seat after joining the Heales Ministry
|27 March 1861
|Thomas Loader
| 
|
|-
||Avoca
|James Grant
| 
|
|Forfeited seat after joining the Heales Ministry
|11 March 1861
|James Grant
| 
|
|-
||Mandurang
|George Brodie
| 
|
|Forfeited seat after joining the Heales Ministry
|8 March 1861
|George Brodie
| 
|
|-
||Warrnambool
|George Horne
| 
|
|Resigned
|4 March 1861
|Thomas Manifold
| 
|
|-
||Ballarat West
|John Bailey
| 
|
|Resigned
|23 February 1861
|Duncan Gillies
| 
|
|-
||Bourke South
|Hibbert Newton
| 
|
|Forfeited seat after joining the Heales Ministry
|13 December 1860
|Hibbert Newton
| 
|
|-
||Ballarat West
|John Bailey
| 
|
|Forfeited seat after joining the Heales Ministry
|12 December 1860
|John Bailey
| 
|
|-
||Ballarat East
|John Humffray
| 
|
|Forfeited seat after joining the Heales Ministry
|11 December 1860
|John Humffray
| 
|
|-
||Maryborough
|Richard Ireland
| 
|
|Forfeited seat after joining the Heales Ministry
|11 December 1860
|Nathaniel Levi
| 
|
|-
||East Bourke Boroughs
|Richard Heales
| 
|
|Forfeited seat after forming the Heales Ministry
|10 December 1860
|Richard Heales
| 
|
|-
||Geelong West
|John Brooke
| 
|
|Forfeited seat after joining the Heales Ministry
|10 December 1860
|John Brooke
| 
|
|-
||Melbourne West
|Thomas Loader
| 
|
|Forfeited seat after joining the Heales Ministry
|10 December 1860
|Thomas Loader
| 
|
|-
||St Kilda
|James Johnston
| 
|
|Forfeited seat after joining the Heales Ministry
|10 December 1860
|James Johnston
| 
|
|-
||Emerald Hill
|Robert Anderson
| 
|
|Forfeited seat after joining the Heales Ministry
|8 December 1860
|Robert Anderson
| 
|
|-
||Williamstown
|George Verdon
| 
|
|Forfeited seat after joining the Heales Ministry
|8 December 1860
|George Verdon
| 
|
|-
||Gipps Land South
|Angus McMillan
| 
|
|Resigned
|23 November 1860
|George Hedley
| 
|
|-
||Castlemaine
|Vincent Pyke
| 
|
|Resigned
|17 October 1860
|Vincent Pyke
| 
|
|-
||Castlemaine
|Butler Aspinall
| 
|
|Resigned
|9 October 1860
|James Chapman
| 
|
|-
||Geelong West
|James Harrison
| 
|
|Resigned
|9 October 1860
|Nicholas Foott
| 
|
|-
||Geelong East
|Augustus Greeves
| 
|
|Forfeited seat after joining the Nicholson Ministry
|6 October 1860
|Augustus Greeves
| 
|
|-
||Portland
|Norman McLeod
| 
|
|Resigned
|September 1860
|William Haines
| 
|
|-
||Evelyn
|William Bell
| 
|
|Resigned
|27 March 1860
|William Jones
| 
|
|-
||Ovens
|Alexander Keefer
| 
|
|Resigned
|26 March 1860
|John Donald
| 
|
|-
||Maldon
|George Harker
| 
|
|Resigned
|13 March 1860
|James Martley
| 
|
|-
||Bourke West
|Patrick Phelan
| 
|
|Election declared void
|13 February 1860
|John Riddell
| 
|
|-
||Geelong East
|James Cowie
| 
|
|Resigned
|7 February 1860
|Augustus Greeves
| 
|
|-
||Rodney
|John Everard
| 
|
|Resigned
|11 January 1860
|Wilson Gray
| 
|
|-
||Evelyn
|John King
| 
|
|Resigned
|31 December 1859
|William Bell
| 
|
|-
||Richmond
|James Francis
| 
|
|Forfeited seat after joining the Nicholson Ministry
|9 December 1859
|James Francis
| 
|
|-
||Ovens
|John Wood
| 
|
|Forfeited seat after joining the Nicholson Ministry
|14 November 1859
|John Wood
| 
|
|-
||Ripon and Hampden
|James Service
| 
|
|Forfeited seat after joining the Nicholson Ministry
|14 November 1859
|James Service
| 
|
|-
||Evelyn
|John King
| 
|
|Forfeited seat after joining the Nicholson Ministry
|11 November 1859
|John King
| 
|
|-
||Ballarat West
|John Bailey
| 
|
|Forfeited seat after joining the Nicholson Ministry
|9 November 1859
|John Bailey
| 
|
|-
||Castlemaine
|Vincent Pyke
| 
|
|Forfeited seat after joining the Nicholson Ministry
|9 November 1859
|Vincent Pyke
| 
|
|-
||Melbourne East
|James McCulloch
| 
|
|Forfeited seat after joining the Nicholson Ministry
|8 November 1859
|James McCulloch
| 
|
|-
||Sandridge
|William Nicholson
| 
|
|Forfeited seat after forming the Nicholson Ministry
|8 November 1859
|William Nicholson
| 
|
|-
|colspan=9 |

1st Legislative Assembly (1856–1859) 
|-
!By-election !! Incumbent !! colspan=2|Party !! Reason !! Date !! Winner !! colspan=2|Party
|-
||The Murray
|William Forlonge
| 
|
|Resigned
|1 January 1859
|William Nicholson
| 
|
|-
||South Grant
|William Haines
| 
|
|Resigned
|1 January 1859
|John Bell
| 
|
|-
||South Melbourne
|Andrew Clarke
| 
|
|Resigned
|1 October 1858
|Robert Anderson
| 
|
|-
||St Kilda
|Thomas Fellows
| 
|
|Resigned
|1 May 1858
|John Crews
| 
|
|-
||Dundas and Follett
|Charles Griffith
| 
|
|Resigned
|1 April 1858
|William Mollison
| 
|
|-
||Geelong
|Charles Read
| 
|
|Resigned
|1 April 1858
|James Harrison
| 
|
|-
||Geelong
|Alexander Fyfe
| 
|
|Resigned
|1 February 1858
|George Board
| 
|
|-
||St Kilda
|Frederick Sargood
| 
|
|Resigned
|5 January 1858
|Henry Chapman
| 
|
|-
||The Murray
|John Goodman
| 
|
|Resigned
|1 January 1858
|William Forlonge
| 
|
|-
||Rodney
|John Baragwanath
| 
|
|Resigned
|1 January 1858
|John Everard
| 
|
|-
||Geelong
|Charles Sladen
| 
|
|Resigned
|1 December 1857
|Alexander Thomson
| 
|
|-
||Gippsland
|John King
| 
|
|Resigned
|1 November 1857
|John Johnson
| 
|
|-
||Castlemaine Boroughs
|Alexander Palmer
| 
|
|Resigned
|1 August 1857
|Richard Davies Ireland
| 
|
|-
||West Bourke
|Robert McDougall
| 
|
|Resigned
|1 August 1857
|Joseph Wilkie
| 
|
|-
||Colac
|Andrew Rutherford
| 
|
|Resigned
|1 July 1857
|Theodore Hancock
| 
|
|-
||Portland
|Hugh Childers
| 
|
|Resigned
|1 July 1857
|John Findlay
| 
|
|-
||South Bourke
|Charles Pasley
| 
|
|Resigned
|1 July 1857
|Sidney Ricardo
| 
|
|-
||Ovens
|Daniel Cameron
| 
|
|Resigned
|1 April 1857
|John Wood
| 
|
|-
||Brighton
|Jonathan Binns Were
| 
|
|Resigned
|1 March 1857
|Charles Ebden
| 
|
|-
||Castlemaine Boroughs
|Vincent Pyke
| 
|
|Resigned
|1 March 1857
|Robert Sitwell
| 
|
|-
||East Bourke
|Augustus Greeves
| 
|
|Resigned
|1 March 1857
|Richard Heales
| 
|
|-
||Melbourne
|William Stawell
| 
|
|Resigned
|1 March 1857
|James Service
| 
|
|-
||Melbourne
|John O'Shanassy
| 
|
|Resigned; having been elected to a seat for both the Melbourne and Kilmore districts, he decided to represented the latter.
|1 January 1857
|Henry Langlands
| 
|
|-
|colspan=9 |

List of Legislative Council by-elections

Notes
 In the July 1923 Daylesford by-election following the death of Nationalist MP Donald McLeod, Labor candidate James McDonald was initially declared elected, but a subsequent recount in October found that Roderick McLeod, son of the deceased outgoing member, had in fact won the by-election.

References 

Victoria

By-elections